The Our Lady of Grace Cathedral, also called Cathedral of São Tomé, is a church in the city of São Tomé, capital of the African and island country of São Tomé and Príncipe. It is the cathedral of the Roman Catholic Diocese of São Tomé and Príncipe. It stands at Praça do Povo (People's Square) in the city centre, close to the Presidential Palace. 

Construction of the first church of Our Lady of Grace was started at the end of the fifteenth century under Captain Álvaro de Caminha. This church was situated near the present cathedral. It became the seat of a diocese in 1534. The building was reconstructed between 1576 and 1578, during the reign of King Sebastian of Portugal. In 1784, it was in poor condition with the frontispiece broken. In 1814 it was rebuilt at the initiative of the local population. The last modification was made in 1956, when the church was remodeled in an eclectic revival style, with a neo-romanesque main façade.

See also
Roman Catholicism in São Tomé and Príncipe
List of buildings and structures in São Tomé and Príncipe

References

Roman Catholic cathedrals in São Tomé and Príncipe
Buildings and structures in São Tomé
Roman Catholic churches completed in 1578
Portuguese colonial architecture in São Tomé and Príncipe
16th-century Roman Catholic church buildings